Umkumiut is a seasonal hunting and fishing camp situated in Bethel Census Area, Alaska, United States. This community is not an independent village as it is counted as part of the community of Toksook Bay.

It was also the spring camp site for residents of Nightmute.

References

Populated places in Bethel Census Area, Alaska